Allium drobovii is a species of onion native to the southwestern spurs of the Talas Alatau and the Karatau Mountains in Kazakhstan and Uzbekistan. The plant is in the amaryllis family, originally described by Alexei Ivanovich Vvedensky. A. drobovii does not have any subspecies listed in the Catalog of Life.

References

drobovii
Garlic
Plants described in 1875